On Trinity Sunday 27 May 1725 Johann Sebastian Bach had presented the last cantata of his second cantata cycle, the cycle which coincided with his second year in Leipzig. As director musices of the principal churches in Leipzig he presented a variety of cantatas over the next three years. New cantatas for occasions of the liturgical year composed in this period, except for a few in the chorale cantata format, are known as Bach's third cantata cycle. His next cycle of church cantatas, the Picander cycle, did not start before St. John's Day 24 June 1728.

Sacred music of this period by Bach which doesn't belong to a cantata cycle includes council election cantatas, Passion music for Good Friday, and music for weddings and funerals.

Annually returning services

After Trinity of 1725 Johann Sebastian Bach began a third annual cycle, but with less consistency than the previous two. The oldest extant cantata of the third cycle was composed for the ninth Sunday after Trinity 1725. The third cycle cantata for the first Sunday after Trinity was only composed in 1726. The cycle extends over several years. The cantatas from 1727 have however also been termed as "between the third and the fourth cycles".

There are 35 extant cantatas of the third cantata cycle, for a period with around 170 occasions. For about half of the other occasions a few new chorale cantatas by Bach (retrospectively added to the chorale cantata cycle), restagings of older compositions or presentations of works by other composers are known. Bach had acquired a cycle of cantatas by his second cousin Johann Ludwig Bach of Meiningen. Together with his assistants he provided performance material for at least 18 of these cantatas, for which the Leipzig premieres are known, from Purification (2 February) to Trinity XIII (15 September) 1726.

Johann Sebastian Bach's compositions have a number according to the BWV catalogue, while Johann Ludwig Bach's have a JLB number. Through an erroneous attribution to the former the cantata Denn du wirst meine Seele nicht in der Hölle lassen, JLB 21, is also known by a BWV number. The version of the St Mark Passion attributed to Keiser which Bach presented on Good Friday 1726, including the chorale harmonisations BWV 500a and 1084, is indicated by a Bach Compendium (BC) number. Known works staged under Bach's directorate can in most cases also be indicated by a Bach Digital Work (BDW) number provided by the Bach-digital website.

Historians of music studying the cycle have noted a greater use of solo organ parts, speculated to have been played by Bach or his son [WHICH ONE?], a wide range of texts and movements apparently borrowed from previous instrumental works.

Very little is known about the cantatas for recurring occasions in the year preceding the fourth cantata cycle, at least there is no new composition extant that with certainty can be attributed to the period from Trinity I 1727 to the start of that next cycle.

Notes

Other occasions

Apart from secular cantatas Bach composed in his third to fifth year in Leipzig (BWV 205, Anh. 196, 36a, 249b, 207, 204, Anh. 9, 193a, 198 and 216) also a few cantatas for liturgical occasions likely originated in this period:
 Wedding cantatas: O ewiges Feuer, o Ursprung der Liebe, BWV 34a and Dem Gerechten muß das Licht, BWV 195 (for both cantatas the date is uncertain, but they are usually assumed to belong to this period)
 Funeral cantata: Ich lasse dich nicht, du segnest mich denn, BWV 157 (6 February 1727 in Pomßen near Leipzig – in that funeral service BWV 157 was combined with BWV Anh. 209 as two parts of a funeral cantata). Also the funeral motet Fürchte dich nicht, BWV 228 was performed in this period.
 Chorale cantata with unknown liturgical function, composed between 1728 and 1731: Sei Lob und Ehr dem höchsten Gut, BWV 117
Also the motet for New Year Singet dem Herrn ein neues Lied, BWV 225, would have been first performed in this period.

Librettos

The librettos of the church cantatas presented for the first time in Leipzig during Bach's third to fifth year in that city have a diverse origin. The most substantial group of librettos with a similar structure derives from a 1704 cycle of cantata texts printed in Meiningen, which was used for most of the cantatas presented in the liturgical year 1725–26. In 1728 many of the librettos of cantatas associated with Bach's third to fifth year in Leipzig were grouped in a single publication by Christoph Birkmann.

Trinity III to Trinity VII 1725

A booklet printed in 1725, with the cantata texts from Trinity III to Trinity VI, was recovered in 1971. The period covered by the booklet included the feasts of St. John and Visitation:
 Trinity III, 17 June 1725: Ich ruf zu dir, Herr Jesu Christ, BDW  – the text is Johannes Agricola's 16th-century hymn with the same name. In 1732 Bach composed a per omnes versus chorale cantata with exactly the same text, Ich ruf zu dir, Herr Jesu Christ, BWV 177, for Trinity IV, a cantata that was added to the chorale cantata cycle. Possibly BDW 1669 was an early version of that cantata.
 St. John's Day, 24 June 1725 (coinciding with the fourth Sunday after Trinity): Gelobet sei der Herr, BDW  – a text by Erdmann Neumeister, from a libretto cycle published in 1711.
 Trinity V, 1 July 1725: Der Segen des Herrn machet reich ohne Mühe, BDW 11069 – also by Neumeister (1711 cycle).
 Feast of Visitation, 2 July 1725: Meine Seele erhebt den Herrn, BDW  – Magnificat paraphrase by Maria Aurora von Königsmarck.
 Trinity VI, 8 July 1725: Wer sich rächet, an dem wird sich der Herr wieder rächen, BDW  – text from Neumeister's 1711 cycle.
The musical settings of these librettos as performed in Leipzig on these days have not been recovered. A Trinity VII cantata, only known by its title, is presumed to have been the cantata for the next Sunday,
 Trinity VII, 15 July 1725: Gesegnet ist die Zuversicht, BWV Anh. 1 (?).
It is not certain Bach composed any of the cantatas from Trinity III to Trinity VII 1725. Georg Philipp Telemann has been suggested as their possible composer: he had set all cantata librettos of Neumeister's 1711 cycle, and for the Trinity VII cantata there are two known Telemann cantatas that have the same title (TWV 1:617 and 616).

Trinity IX to Trinity XIII 1725

The ninth Sunday after Trinity is the first occasion with an extant new cantata by J. S. Bach after Trinity 1725:
 Trinity IX, 29 July 1725: Tue Rechnung! Donnerwort, BWV 168 on a libretto by Salomon Franck.
The next extant cantata is for the 12th Sunday after Trinity:
 Trinity XII, 19 August 1725: Lobe den Herren, den mächtigen König der Ehren, BWV 137, is a chorale cantata with a libretto consisting of five unmodified stanzas of a 17th-century hymn, known in English as "Praise to the Lord, the Almighty", by Joachim Neander. The cantata was added to the chorale cantata cycle (there is no other extant Trinity XII cantata in the chorale cantata format by Bach).
The next Sunday Bach sets again a text by Franck:
 Trinity XIII, 26 August 1725: Ihr, die ihr euch von Christo nennet, BWV 164, from Evangelisches Andachts-Opffer (1715).

Picander

The sacred cantata for the next occasion, Council Election (Ratswahl), does not belong to any cycle. Its libretto was published in 1725:
 Council Election, Monday 27 August 1725: Wünschet Jerusalem Glück, BWV Anh. 4, text by Picander, music lost.
In this period Bach relied on Picander for the librettos of several of his secular cantatas, but also for a few more church cantatas:
 Michaelmas, 29 September 1726: Es erhub sich ein Streit, BWV 19, text heavily reworked from Picander's 1724–25 cantata cycle.
 Funeral in Pomßen, 6 February 1727: Ich lasse dich nicht, du segnest mich denn, BWV 157, libretto published by Picander in 1727.
 Septuagesima (third Sunday before lent), 9 February 1727: Ich bin vergnügt mit meinem Glücke, BWV 84. A reworked version of the libretto of this cantata was published by Picander in his 1728–29 cantata cycle as Ich bin vergnügt mit meinem Stande, for performance on Septuagesima 13 February 1729. Bach did however not seem to have considered his 1727 Septuagesima cantata as a part of the later cycle.
Other early versions of librettos that were adopted by Picander in his 1728–29 cycle may have been set by Bach in 1727. Recent recovery of a copy of Birkmann's 1728 libretto cycle seems to suggest Welt, behalte du das Deine and Ich kann mich besser nicht versorgen for the first and the second Sunday after Easter respectively.

Lehms' cycle of 1711

A cantata with a libretto from a cycle by Georg Christian Lehms, published as Gottgefälliges Kirchen-Opffer in 1711, may have been presented on the 15th Sunday after Trinity 1725:
 Trinity XV, : Liebster Gott, vergißt du mich, BWV Anh. 209? – Music lost. In Lehms' cycle the cantata text was assigned to Trinity VII. However, since Birkmann published the cantata libretto for Trinity XV, that Sunday of 1725 is the more likely date of the cantata's first performance. Later the cantata was combined with BWV 157 for a funeral cantata performed in Pomßen (6 February 1727, see above).

From Christmas 1725 to the second Sunday after Trinity 1726 Bach drew most of his cantata librettos from Lehms' 1711 libretto cycle:
 Christmas, 25 December 1725: Unser Mund sei voll Lachens, BWV 110
 Second day of Christmas, 26 December 1725: Selig ist der Mann, BWV 57, dialogue cantata
 Third day of Christmas, 27 December 1725: Süßer Trost, mein Jesus kömmt, BWV 151
 New Year, 1 January 1726: Herr Gott, dich loben wir, BWV 16
 First Sunday after Epiphany, : Liebster Jesu, mein Verlangen, BWV 32, dialogue cantata
 Second Sunday after Epiphany, : Meine Seufzer, meine Tränen, BWV 13

In the Post Trinitatem season of 1726 there are two further cantatas from Lehms' 1711 cycle:
 Sixth Sunday after Trinity, : Vergnügte Ruh, beliebte Seelenlust, BWV 170
 Twelfth Sunday after Trinity, : Geist und Seele wird verwirret, BWV 35

Other cantatas between Council Election 1725 and Purification 1726

Trinity XVII may have seen the performance of another cantata on a libretto by Franck:
 Trinity XVII, : Seht, so ist die falsche Welt

From Council Election to the Christmas season of 1725 there is only one further cantata extant:
 Reformation Day, 31 October 1725: Gott der Herr ist Sonn und Schild, BWV 79 – librettist unknown

The cantata for the Sunday between Christmas 1725 and New Year 1726 has a libretto drawn from Erdman Neumeister's fourth cycle:
 Christmas I, : Gottlob! nun geht das Jahr zu Ende, BWV 28

The cantata for the third Sunday after Epiphany 1726 has a libretto from Salomon Franck's Evangelisches Andachts=Opffer:
 Epiphany III, : Alles nur nach Gottes Willen, BWV 72

Libretto cycle published in Meiningen

In 1704 a cycle of cantata texts was published anonymously in Meiningen, under the title Sonn- und Fest-Andachten. Its third edition appeared under the title Sonntags- Und Fest-Andachten in 1719. Bach scholars have suggested that Ernst Ludwig I, Duke of Saxe-Meiningen, Johann Ludwig Bach's employer, might have been the author of these librettos. The librettos follow a strict format, in two variants. The short form applies to most of the cantatas:
 Biblical text from the Old Testament (OT)
 Recitative
 Aria
 Biblical text from the New Testament (NT)
 Aria
 Recitative
 Chorale: one or more stanzas from a Lutheran hymn
The build is symmetrical around the central New Testament section. The long form has a strophic poem instead of the Aria and Recitative after the New Testament section. When the cantata is split in two parts, as was customary in Leipzig, the split was usually after the third item, so that both parts started with a prose dictum (all other sections being versified). The 18 cantatas by Johann Ludwig Bach that were performed in Leipzig from Purification to Trinity XIII 1726 had a libretto from this cycle, as well as seven of the cantatas composed by Johann Sebastian Bach which were presented for the first time from Ascension to Trinity XIV 1726. Six of the extant cantatas of the latter used the short form, only the first one, for Ascension, has a libretto in the long form.

Further cantatas with a libretto from the Meiningen cycle may have been presented in Leipzig in 1726, for instance on the fourth and the ninth Sundays after Trinity. In chronological order:
 Purification, : Mache dich auf, werde licht, JLB 9
 Epiphany IV, : Gott ist unser Zuversicht, JLB 1
 Epiphany V, : Der Gottlosen Arbeit, JLB 2
 Septuagesima, : Darum will ich auch erwählen, JLB 3
 Sexagesima, : Darum säet euch Gerechtigkeit, JLB 4
 Estomihi, : Ja, mir hast du Arbeit gemacht, JLB 5 (OT: ; NT: ; Hymn text: "Herzliebster Jesu, was hast du verbrochen" by Heermann, on a melody by Crüger)
 Easter, : Denn du wirst meine Seele nicht in der Hölle lassen, JLB 21 (a.k.a. BWV 15)
 Easter Monday, : Er ist aus der Angst und Gericht genommen, JLB 10
 Easter Tuesday, : Er machet uns lebendig, JLB 11
 Easter I, : Wie lieblich sind auf den Bergen, JLB 6
 Easter II, : Und ich will ihnen einen einigen Hirten, JLB 12
 Easter III, : Die mit Tränen säen, JLB 8 (OT: ; NT: ; Hymn: "Kommt her zu mir" by Georg Grünwald)
 Easter IV, : Die Weisheit kömmt nicht, JLB 14
 Ascension, : Gott fähret auf mit Jauchzen, BWV 43
 Trinity I, : Brich dem Hungrigen dein Brot, BWV 39
 St. John's Day, : Siehe, ich will meinen Engel senden, JLB 17
 Visitation, : Der Herr wird ein Neues im Lande, JLB 13
 Trinity IV, : no cantata extant – possibly a setting of Ich tue Barmherzigkeit an vielen Tausenden was presented.
 Trinity V, : Siehe, ich will viel Fischer aussenden, BWV 88
 Trinity VI, : Ich will meinen Geist, JLB 7
 Trinity VII, : Es wartet alles auf dich, BWV 187
 Trinity VIII, : Es ist dir gesagt, Mensch, was gut ist, BWV 45
 Trinity IX, : no cantata extant – possibly a setting of Machet euch Freunde mit dem ungerechten Mammon was presented.
 Trinity X, : Herr, deine Augen sehen nach dem Glauben, BWV 102
 Trinity XI, : Durch sein Erkenntnis, JLB 15
 Trinity XIII, : Ich aber ging für dir über, JLB 16
 Trinity XIV, : Wer Dank opfert, der preiset mich, BWV 17
For cantatas not belonging to the Meiningen libretto cycle, performed on the sixth and twelfth Sunday after Trinity 1726, see above in the section on Lehms' cycle of 1711. J. S. Bach's cantata for Trinity VI (with Lehms' libretto) was a short solo cantata. J. L. Bach's cantata for the same day, on a Meiningen libretto, required a chorus only for its last movement. Probably this cantata wasn't split: one of the two cantatas for this Sunday in 1726 was sung as part I, and the other as part II.

Easter III 1726 or 1728 
 Easter III, 12 May 1726 or 18 April 1728: Wir müssen durch viel Trübsal, BWV 146, librettist unknown

Michaelmas to Trinity XVII 1726
 St. Michael's Day: BWV 19 → Picander
 Trinity XVI: BWV 27 → Neumeister
 Trinity XVII: BWV 47 → Helbig

Birkmann cantatas
 Trinity XVIII: BWV 169
 Trinity XIX: BWV 56
 Trinity XX: BWV 49, dialogue cantata
 Trinity XXI: BWV 98
 Trinity XXII: BWV 55
 Trinity XXIII: BWV 52
 New Year I: BWV 58 (1727), dialogue cantata
 Purification: BWV 82 (1727)

Septuagesima to Pentecost Monday 1727
 Septuagesima: BWV 84 (1727) → Picander
 Pentecost: BWV 34 (1727)
 Pentecost 2: BWV 173 (1727)

References

Sources
 BWV2a Bach-Werke-Verzeichnis, Breitkopf & Härtel, 1998
 NBA Neue Bach-Ausgabe, Bärenreiter, 1954 to 2007
 Z. Philip Ambrose Texts of the Complete Vocal Works with English Translation and Commentary University of Vermont 2005–2011
 Alberto Basso. Frau Musika: La vita e le opere di J. S. Bach, Volume 2: Lipsia e le opere de la maturità (1723–1750). Turin: EDT, 1983. 
 Walter F. Bischof. The Bach Cantatas University of Alberta 2003–2010
 Christine Blanken. "A Cantata-Text Cycle of 1728 from Nuremberg: a Preliminary Report on a Discovery relating to J. S. Bach's so-called 'Third Annual Cantata Cycle'", pp. 9–30 in Understanding Bach, Vol. 10, 2015.
 Malcolm Boyd. Bach. Oxford University Press, 2006. 
 Alfred Dürr: Johann Sebastian Bach: Die Kantaten. Bärenreiter, Kassel 1999,  (in German)
 Alfred Dürr: The Cantatas of J.S. Bach, Oxford University Press, 2006. 
 
 
 Werner Neumann: Handbuch der Kantaten J.S.Bachs, 1947, 5th ed. 1984, 
 Martin Petzold: Bach-Kommentar. Theologisch-musikwissenschaftliche Kommentierung der geistlichen Vokalwerke Johann Sebastian Bachs.
 Vol. I: Die geistlichen Kantaten des 1. bis 27. Trinitatis-Sonntages, Kassel/Stuttgart 2004
 Vol. II: Die geistlichen Kantaten vom 1. Advent bis zum Trinitatisfest, Kassel/Stuttgart 2007
 [Vol. III: Passionen, Messen, Motetten, Fest- und Kasualkantaten. Bärenreiter 2017. ]
 Hans-Joachim Schulze: Die Bach-Kantaten: Einführungen zu sämtlichen Kantaten Johann Sebastian Bachs Leipzig: Evangelische Verlags-Anstalt; Stuttgart: Carus-Verlag 2006 (Edition Bach-Archiv Leipzig)  (EVA),  (in German)
 Tatiana Shabalina "Recent Discoveries in St Petersburg and their Meaning for the Understanding of Bach’s Cantatas" pp. 77–99 in Understanding Bach 4, 2009
 Christoph Wolff: Johann Sebastian Bach: The Learned Musician. W. W. Norton & Company, 2001. 
 Christoph Wolff/Ton Koopman: Die Welt der Bach-Kantaten Verlag J.B. Metzler, Stuttgart, Weimar 2006  (in German)
 Günther Zedler. Die Kantaten von Johann Sebastian Bach: Eine Einführung in die Werkgattung. Books on Demand, 2011. 
 Philippe and Gérard Zwang. Guide pratique des cantates de Bach. Second revised and augmented edition. L'Harmattan, 2005. 

Third to fifth year in Leipzig, Church cantatas of Bach's
1720s in music